The 2022 Eastern Intercollegiate Volleyball Association Tournament was a men's volleyball tournament for the Eastern Intercollegiate Volleyball Association during the 2022 NCAA Division I & II men's volleyball season. It was held April 20 through April 23, 2022 at the #1 seed's court. The winner received the EIVA's automatic bid to the 2022 NCAA Volleyball Tournament.

Seeds
The EIVA continued to use its 2021 format in 2022. However, only the top six schools participated in the tournament. Seeds 1 and 2 received byes to the semifinals, while Seed 3 played Seed 6 and Seed 4 played Seed 5 in the conference tournament opening round. All matches were held at Rec Hall in University Park, Pennsylvania, home court of top seed Penn State.

Seedings and placement were determined by win percentage should teams not have played every match. Tiebreaker procedures were as follows:
Head-to-head match record
Head-to-head sets won against each other
Head-to-head points amongst the tied teams
Sets winning percentage within the conference
Points against teams within the conference
Coin toss by the EIVA Commissioner

Schedule and results

Bracket

Notes

References

2022 Eastern Intercollegiate Volleyball Association season
Volleyball competitions in the United States